Bangor University, in north Wales, currently runs years two to four of a graduate medical degree programme on behalf of Cardiff University. It has been proposed that a medical school be set up in Bangor by September 2024.

From September 2024, Bangor University is set to be delivering and awarding both undergraduate and postgraduate medical degrees. The medical school termed the North Wales Medical School would be the first in North Wales.

Background 
In 2019, the four-year Graduate Entry Medicine (GEM) course was started at the School of Medical Sciences at Bangor University. 

The course, "Cardiff University C21 North Wales Medicine programme", is delivered on behalf of Cardiff University. The number of students was increased from 20 students for the 2020/21 academic year to 25 in 2021/22 and 40 in 2022/23.

For the 2023/2024 academic year, Bangor University delivers the C21 North Wales Graduate entry medicine course which is 4 years and delivered in collaboration with Cardiff University School of Medicine. The course places a greater emphasis on community medicine but is broadly based on the Cardiff medicine course.

Proposals 
Plaid Cymru have called for a medical campus in north Wales since at least 2001, with Plaid Cymru assembly member and medical doctor, Dai Lloyd saying “We have had only one medical school, although a second campus in Swansea is becoming a reality. Our policy is to have a campus in Bangor too. We don't produce enough doctors. Ireland, with the same population, has six medical schools, and Scotland has five".

Initial rejection 
In July 2017, the Welsh Labour government rejected calls for a North Wales medical school. Plaid Cymru assembly member Siân Gwenllian referred to this as a "betrayal of the people of Bangor, Arfon and all of the North". Professor Dean Williams of Bangor University said in May 2017 that Bangor University was ready to establish a new medical school for the North. Instead the Welsh health secretary, Vaughan Gething said "A plan of education and training in north Wales through closer collaboration between Cardiff, Swansea and Bangor universities can ensure the increase in opportunities for medical education in north Wales." In response, Gwenllian said, "The need for a medical school in Bangor is clear, and the Welsh Government itself has recognised this [...] and tried to bury this blow to medical students and patients".

In September 2017 Plaid Cymru called for 40 medical student to be trained in north Wales if Bangor University collaborated with medical schools in the south. Rhun ap Iorwerth said that Plaid Cymru's ultimate goal was to form an independent medical school in Bangor, "Our proposals give us a way forward to achieving the goal of providing strong and sustainable hospital services across north Wales."

Existing plans 
In 2020 the Welsh government had formed a research group to assess the feasibility of an independent Bangor medical school.

In May 2021, Jo Whitehead, CEO of Betsi Cadwaladr University Health Board stated that a new Medical and Health Sciences School in North Wales could be achieved by 2025. Welsh Health Minister Vaughan Gething stated that he wanted a task and finish group to assess whether a North Wales medical School is “practical and achievable”. A task and finish group chaired by Professor Elizabeth Treasure, has been looking at the idea since autumn 2020. Siân Gwenllian of Plaid Cymru added, “I and Plaid Cymru have been campaigning on this issue for years, and it was an integral part of my re-election campaign in the Senedd elections.", “In 2017 Plaid Cymru secured a commitment from the previous Government to a budget to get the job started and now nearly 40 prospective doctors have been receiving part of their training at Bangor."

Welsh Health Minister Eluned Morgan stated in December 2022 that “Intake numbers for the Bangor medical school have been approved, and funding has also approved for 140 students per year once the school reaches optimum capacity." Morgan added that a letter “of assurance was sent to General Medical Council colleagues in November” which would “allow Bangor University to continue their forward momentum through the accreditation process.” Morgan also added on the prospect of ensuring that a proportion of students are Welsh speaking, “We are highly aware that we do need to be cognisant of how much recruitment there will be in terms of the numbers that are Welsh speaking … I know that a particular focus has been placed on that, with work currently being done in that area. So, I’m pleased to say that that is something that they are taking seriously.”

Confirmation 
From September 2024, Bangor University will be offering their own independent programme with the support of the Welsh Government, subject to GMC approval. Bangor University will be offering a 5-year medicine course and a 4-year graduate entry course. Cardiff University is acting as the contingency guarantor as required by the GMC. Students are able to study most of the elements of the course in Welsh as well as English.

The full North Wales degree uses an adaptation of Cardiff University's C21 programme. This adaptation aims to meet the needs of the mixed rural and urban areas across North Wales which also embraces the Welsh language and culture of in North Wales.

The Welsh government will fund up to 140 students per annum and a there will be a gradual increase in the number of students trained until reaching capacity of 'hundreds" from 2029. This is said to allow time to assess and evaluate the quality of teaching and student experience. The north Wales medical school will be established in a partnership between the Welsh Government, Bangor University, Cardiff University and Betsi Cadwaladr University Health Board.

Purpose 
A primary goal of the establishment of the medical school is to address the recruitment of doctors in northern Wales. The numbers of general practitioners (GP) has increased slightly over Wales but attracting doctors to work in northern Wales has traditionally been a challenge. Currently there are more than 28 vacant full-time GP posts which are being filled by locum staff.

Secondary school engagement in North Wales 
Since 2016, doctors at Ysbyty Glan Clwyd and Ysbyty Gwynedd have guided Year 12 and 13 pupils in local state schools with their Medicine and Dentistry applications. In 2023 40 students participated in the Seren Medics porgramme with Ysbyty Glan Clwyd, and the programme has been expanded to Gwynedd and Flint.

References 

Medical schools in Wales
Bangor University
Proposals in Wales